The Juno Award for "International Entertainer of the Year" was awarded from 1989 - 1993, as recognition for the best international musicians, from a Canadian perspective.

Winners

References

International Entertainer